(), also called  is a form of underskirt, which was made of woven horsetail. It was tied inside the undergarments of its wearer.

It was popular for a few years from the mid-to-late 15th century during the reign of Emperor Chenghua (1465 –1488) and Hongzhi (1488 – 1506). According to the historical records dating to the Ming dynasty, the  originated in Joseon and was first imported in the capital of the Ming dynasty according to the 《》by Lu Rong (1436–1494).  was later produced by Ming dynasty local weavers by the late 15th century when the local weavers gained the horsetails weaving skills leading to the theft of tails from the horses owned by officials in order to supply themselves with the necessary materials to produce the underskirt. This form of fashion was however perceived as exotic rather than Chinese.

There is no record of the term  in the historical records found in the Joseon dynasty dating to the fifteenth century, such as the Veritable Records of the Joseon Dynasty, the Private records of diplomatic envoys《使行錄》, or in the Written collections《文集》written by the scholars-officials. There is a high possibly that the  actually did not originate from Joseon and that its Joseon origin was a rumour which left Lu Rong with inaccurate information when the latter wrote his collection. It is, however, proposed by Doyoung Koo, a research Fellow at the Northeast Asian History Foundation, that the  might be a Joseon garment item called , which can be found in the Veritable Records of the Joseon dynasty.

Terminology 
 is literally translated as 'horsetail skirt'. The term  was used by Lu Rong in the 《》.

Faqun (发裙) is literally translated as 'hair skirt'. The term is composed of two characters fa (发) which means 'hair' and qun (裙) which means 'skirt'. The term faqun was used in the Yubu biji (寓圃笔记) by a Ming dynasty scholar during the reign of Hongzhi named Wang Qi (王锜).

In the Gujin Xiaoshi (古今笑史) by Feng Menglong, it was referred as maweichenqun (马尾衬裙). The term is composed of the characters mawei (马尾) which means 'horsetail' and chenqun (衬裙) which means 'petticoat'.

In the Mingshilu Xiaozongshilu (明實錄孝宗實錄), it was referred as maweifu (马尾服), which is literally translatted as 'horsetail dress'.

Construction and design 
According to Wang Qi, a Ming dynasty scholar, the faqun could be tied inside the undergarments in order to "expand the skirt to look like an umbrella", akin to a crinoline. According to Wang Qi, when people were fat, they would wear one faqun, but when they were thin, they would wear two or three faqun. The use of horsehair would provide structure and stiffness which would make an outerskirt spread outwards making it look like an umbrella.

History in Chinese records 
The skill of weaving of horse-hair was rare in China. According to the 《》by Lu Rong (1436–1494),  was originally imported in the capital of the Ming dynasty from Joseon where people could buy them, but at that time, no one in the capital had the ability to weave them. Later on, it is only when some people in the capital of the Ming dynasty started to produce it and sell it that more people to wear it regardless of social status and become widely accepted. According to Lu Rong, many court officials (朝官) were wearing it in the late years of reign of Chenghua.

According to Chen Hongmo, another Ming dynasty scholar, the popularity of the  during the Chenghua and Hongzhi period led to people pulling off the tails of some military horses. According to Feng Menglong in the Gujin Xiaoshi (古今笑史), an official gave the advice to ban the maweiqun in the early days of Hongzhi as the liking of the maweiqun among the literati in the capital led to the stealth of tails of horses. The maweiqun was banned in the early Hongzhi era (1487-1505) according to the Shuyuan zaji and to the Mingshilu Xiaozongshilu (明實錄孝宗實錄) in 1488 AD. Emperor Hongzhi's ban led to the end of the popularity of the maweiqun and to its disappearance.

Cultural significance 

Although the faqun was worn by many court officials, it was criticized by some Confucian scholars who deemed it as fuyao (服妖). Fuyao is a general term with negative connotation which is employed for what is considered as being strange clothing style, or for deviant dressing styles, or for aberrance in clothing. Clothing considered as fuyao typically (i) violates ritual norms and clothing regulations, (ii) are extravagant and luxurious form of clothing, (iii) violates the yin and yang principle, and (iv) are strange and inauspicious form of clothing.

Wang Qi himself criticized it, "Some people wear this [faqun] to show off. But only vulgar officials and profligate sons of the newly rich wear it. Scholars look down on it very much because it is close to the bewitching dress (fuyao)". The Shuyuan zaji (椒园杂记) also refer to it as being fuyao. 

In the case of the maweiqun, its widened silhouette also made it shàngjiǎn xiàfēng which reflects an inversion of Heaven and Earth, and therefore contradicts the traditional Chinese principle of Heaven and Earth order. In traditional Chinese culture, the symbolism of two-pieces garments hold great importance as it symbolizes the greater order of Heaven and Earth; in the I-Ching, upper garment represents Heaven while the lower garment represents the Earth.

See also 

 Sokgot - Korean undergarments
 Mamianqun - A traditional Han Chinese skirt

Notes

References 

Korean clothing
Chinese clothing